is a city located in Shizuoka Prefecture, Japan.

Geography
Shimada is located in the Shida Plains of west-central Shizuoka Prefecture. It is located on both banks of the Ōi River. The area enjoys a warm maritime climate with hot, humid summers and mild, cool winters.

Surrounding municipalities
Shizuoka Prefecture
Aoi-ku, Shizuoka
Tenryū-ku, Hamamatsu
Fujieda
Kakegawa
Kikugawa
Makinohara
Yaizu
Yoshida, Haibara District
Kawanehon, Haibara District
Mori, Shuchi District

Demographics
Per Japanese census data, the population of Shimada has remained steady over the past 50 years.

Climate
The city has a climate characterized by hot and humid summers, and relatively mild winters (Köppen climate classification Cfa).  The average annual temperature in Shimada is 15.7 °C. The average annual rainfall is 2142 mm with September as the wettest month. The temperatures are highest on average in August, at around 26.5 °C, and lowest in January, at around 5.2 °C.

History
Shimada (Kanaya) began as an outlying fortification to Kakegawa Castle erected by Yamauchi Kazutoyo in the Sengoku period to control the crossing of the Ōi River. In the Edo period, Kanaya-juku and Shimada-juku developed as post towns on the Tōkaidō highway connecting Edo with Kyoto. The area was mostly tenryō territory under direct control of the Tokugawa shogunate with a daikansho based at a Jinya located within Shimada-juku. As the Tokugawa shogunate forbade the construction of any bridge or establishment of a ferry service on the Ōi River for defensive purposes, travellers were often detained at either Shimada or Kanaya for days, sometimes weeks, waiting for the river levels to fall to fordable levels. The first bridge (the Hōrai Bridge) across the river connected these two towns in 1879, after the Meiji Restoration.

With the establishment of the modern municipalities system in the early Meiji period in 1889, Kanaya Town was created within Haibara District, and Shimada Town within Shida District. On April 16, 1889, the two towns were connected by rail, with the opening of Shimada Station on the Tōkaidō Main Line.

Shimada was elevated to city status on January 1, 1948.  On January 1, 1955, it annexed neighboring Rokugō Village, Ōtsu Village, Daichō Village and a portion of Ikumi Village. On June 1, 1961 it further expanded through annexation of Hatsukura Village.

On May 1, 2005, the town of Kanaya (from Haibara District) was merged into Shimada.

On April 1, 2008, the town of Kawane (also from Haibara District) was also merged into Shimada.

On March 15, 2012, the city became the second municipality, after Tokyo, outside Tōhoku to accept debris from the 2011 Tōhoku earthquake and tsunami for disposal in the town's incinerators.  Other cities had been reluctant to accept debris from the disaster, in spite of being asked to help recovery efforts, because of fears that the debris were contaminated by radiation from the Fukushima Daiichi nuclear disaster.

Government
Shimada has a mayor-council form of government with a directly elected mayor and a unicameral city legislature of 20 members. The city contributes two members to the Shizuoka Prefectural Assembly.

Economy
The economy of Shimada is primarily agricultural, with green tea as the main crop. Light industries of Shimada include factories for the production of automobile components.

Education
Shimada has 18 public elementary schools and seven middle schools operated by the city government and one middle school operated by the national government. The city has four public high schools operated by the Shizuoka Prefectural Board of Education, and one private high school. The prefecture also operates one special education school for the handicapped.

Transportation

Railway
 Central Japan Railway Company - Tōkaidō Main Line
  - - 
 Ōigawa Railway Ōigawa Main Line

Highway
  Tōmei Expressway
  Shin-Tōmei Expressway

Airport
Shizuoka Airport

International relations
Shimada is twinned with the following cities:
 Himi, Toyama, Japan, from April 15, 1987
 Huzhou, Zhejiang, China, from May 1987
 Brienz, Switzerland, from August 10, 1996
 Richmond, California, United States, from December 1961. There is currently a student exchange program between Shimada and Richmond.

Local attractions
Hōrai Bridge
Ōigawa Railway
Suwahara Castle ruins, a National Historic Site

Notable people from Shimada
Masafumi Gotō, musician
Tarzan Goto, professional wrestler
Takahiro Kawamura, professional football player
Kayoko Kishimoto, actress
Hokuto Matsumura, member of idol group SixTONES
Sho Naruoka, professional football player
Minato Oike, BMX freestyle cyclist
Hirotoki Onozawa, professional rugby player
Masaki Yamamoto, professional football player

References

External links

 
 

 
Cities in Shizuoka Prefecture